The 6th Gran Premio del Valentino was a non-championship Formula One motor race held on 6 April 1952 at the Parco del Valentino in Turin. The Grand Prix was won by Luigi Villoresi driving a Ferrari 375. Piero Taruffi and Rudi Fischer were second and third in their Ferrari 500s. Giuseppe Farina in another 375 started from pole and set fastest lap but retired after a crash.

Classification

Race

References

Valentino
1952 in Italian motorsport